Mamillocylichna is a genus of sea snails or bubble snails, marine gastropod molluscs in the family Cylichnidae, the "chalice bubble snails".

Species
 Mamillocylichna abyssicola Bouchet, 1975
 Mamillocylichna richardi (Dautzenberg, 1889)

References

 Nordsieck, F. (1972). Die europäischen Meeresschnecken (Opisthobranchia mit Pyramidellidae; Rissoacea). Vom Eismeer bis Kapverden, Mittelmeer und Schwarzes Meer. Gustav Fischer, Stuttgart. XIII + 327 pp.

External links
 
 Gofas, S.; Le Renard, J.; Bouchet, P. (2001). Mollusca. in: Costello, M.J. et al. (eds), European Register of Marine Species: a check-list of the marine species in Europe and a bibliography of guides to their identification. Patrimoines Naturels. 50: 180-213

Cylichnidae